"Teen Angst (What the World Needs Now)" is a song by the rock band Cracker. Released in 1992, it was the first single from their debut album Cracker, and went to #1 on the US Modern Rock chart.

The song was later released on the compilation albums, Garage D'Or and Get On with It: The Best of Cracker. Re-recordings of the song appear on the album Greatest Hits Redux and — accompanied by bluegrass band Leftover Salmon — O' Cracker Where Art Thou?.

Track listings
"Teen Angst (What the World Needs Now)" - 4:11  	
"Can I Take My Gun to Heaven?" - 3:50 	
"China" - 3:09

Chart positions

See also
Number one modern rock hits of 1992

In popular culture
The song was made available for download on June 5, 2012 to play in Rock Band 3 Basic and PRO mode utilizing real guitar / bass guitar, and MIDI compatible electronic drum kits.

References

1992 singles
Cracker (band) songs
Virgin Records singles
1992 songs